Meinir is a hamlet in the  community of Llannerch-y-medd, Ynys Môn, Wales, which is 138.5 miles (222.9 km) from Cardiff and 220.2 miles (354.3 km) from London.

The name "Meinir" in the Welsh language means 'girl'.

References

See also
List of localities in Wales by population

Villages in Anglesey